Mark Masri (born 23 August 1973) is a Canadian singer, songwriter and producer. He is signed to EMI record label and has released five albums: Mark Masri, La Voce, Christmas Is..., A Christmas Time with You, and Intimo, as well as a special US release: See My Face US. He sings in English and also has a multilingual repertoire of interpretations. On his album La Voce he sings a collection of classic songs in six languages.

History
Mark Masri was born to a Lebanese immigrant father, a Pentecostal minister, and a Canadian mother, a banker. He moved with his family from Ontario to various locations including Quebec and Nova Scotia. He started singing in his father's small church near Antigonish, Nova Scotia, when he was nine. The family returned to Scarborough, Ontario in the 1980s. At twelve he was singing in local churches and giving piano recitals. He led in many choirs and worked as a music producer for the CTS network. When his job position was eliminated, he decided to devote all his time to music. In 2000 he released his first album, self-titled Mark Masri.

After Masri recorded a demo with Amy Sky, on a song she thought might suit Jim Brickman, he was very interested and invited Masri in 2008 to tour with him. They also collaborated on Brickman's hit "Christmas Is..." that reached No. 18 on Billboard Hot Adult Contemporary Tracks. Masri also appeared as a guest vocalist on Jim Brickman's 2009 CD Faith, which was nominated for Best New Age Album at the Grammy Awards.

He is married to Angela since 1998 and they have a son together.

Awards and nominations
 In 2001, nominated for a Juno Award in the category Best Gospel Album for Mark Masri
 In 2001, winner of the GMA Canada Covenant Award for
 Pop Album of the Year: Mark Masri
 Contemporary Gospel Song Of The Year: "Dwell In The House"
 Pop Song Of The Year: "Take My Hand" (with Madeline Stone and Bernie Herms)
 In 2010, winner of the GMA Canada Covenant Award for three categories:
 Classical – Traditional Song of the Year for "Time" (Mark Masri featuring Nita Whitaker) (Mark Masri jointly with Amy Sky))
 Classical – Traditional Album of the Year for La Voce
 Inspirational Song of the Year for "Hold On" ((Mark Masri jointly with Adam Crossley and John Acosta

Discography

Albums
2000: Mark Masri (independent limited edition)
2008: See My Face (only in the United States)
2009: Christmas Is...
2010: La Voce
2010: A Christmas Time with You
2011: Intimo
2014: Mark Masri Live (CD and DVD)
2016: Beating Heart

Featured
2008: "Christmas Is" by Jim Brickman feat. Mark Masri – reached No. 18 on Billboard Hot Adult Contemporary Tracks
2009: "Breathe, Dream, Pray, Love" in album Home (Jim Brickman feat. Mark Masri and Delta Goodrem)
2010: "To Be Wanted" by Olivia Newton-John feat. Mark Masri appeared on Newton-John's album Grace and Gratitude – Renewed edition) (United States release). The album reached US Billboard New Age albums chart at No. 2, Billboard Christian albums chart at No. 36 and Billboard Christian/Gospel albums chart at No. 54.
2010: "Waiting" (Rosanna Riverso feat. Mark Masri) on her album Let There Be Peace

References

External links
 Official website

1973 births
Living people
Musicians from Toronto
Canadian people of Lebanese descent
Canadian pop singers
Canadian gospel singers
21st-century Canadian male singers